Ali G Indahouse is a 2002 British comedy film written by Sacha Baron Cohen and Dan Mazer, directed by Mark Mylod, and starring Baron Cohen as Ali G, the character he originally played on the Channel 4 comedy series The 11 O'Clock Show and Da Ali G Show. It is the first of four films based on Baron Cohen's characters from Da Ali G Show, followed by Borat (2006), Brüno (2009), and Borat Subsequent Moviefilm (2020). It is the only one of these films to consist solely of a fictional narrative with no mockumentary element.

Plot
Ali G is the leader of Da West Staines Massiv, a fictional gang composed of wannabe gangsters from Staines. Their chief rivals are Da East Staines Massiv. Da West Staines Massiv decide to protest when they learn that their cherished hangout, the John Nike Leisure Centre (where Ali teaches a life support group for young schoolboys), will be demolished by the local council. After he goes on a hunger strike and is spotted locked to some railings by the Deputy Prime Minister David Carlton, Ali is thrown into a world of political corruption as the Deputy Prime Minister tries to use him as a catalyst to ruin the Prime Minister's reputation. Ali is put forward as a candidate to be the next MP for Staines and manages to alienate most of the electorate. During a debate, he tries to insult his rival candidate by claiming that the candidate "sucked off a horse". Unbeknownst to Ali, the candidate actually did so and subsequently resigns, leaving Ali the winner.

Though he is inexperienced as an MP, Ali's outlandish behaviour and ideas seem to work. He visits a customs checkpoint in Dover as a delegate compiling a report, where he invites the West Staines Massiv under the guise of experts to consume the confiscated drugs and pornography in the evidence room, and through strategies such as making education more relatable and ensuring the immigration of attractive women into the country, Ali becomes popular; he meets the Prime Minister's goals and brings the PM's percentage lead in the polls up by 22%. With this, the Prime Minister offers to save the John Nike Leisure Centre. Ali accompanies the Prime Minister to a United Nations peace conference to avert war between Chad and Burkina Faso. The United States and Russia back opposing countries, and both threaten nuclear attacks. Ali sneaks into the catering area and drugs everyone's tea with cannabis acquired during the customs visit, which has the side effect of making the leaders of Chad and Burkina Faso allies and even lovers. The Prime Minister says that Ali has saved the world, but Carlton's secretary Kate Hedges figures out what Ali has done and sends the empty cannabis bag to the press. Ali is forced to leave Parliament.

Before the John Nike Leisure Centre can be saved from imminent demolition, a video emerges of Ali and his girlfriend having sex in the Prime Minister's bedroom at Chequers. As Ali was wearing items of the Prime Minister's clothing at the time, the press misconstrues the video as the Prime Minister's sex tape with a prostitute, forcing the Prime Minister's resignation. This results in Carlton being made acting Prime Minister, and he orders the destruction of the leisure centre. He reveals that he purchased all available real estate in Staines, knowing that the town will be destroyed to make way for the construction of a new terminal for Heathrow Airport which will make him wealthy. The West Staines Massiv race to find the master copy of the tape proving the Prime Minister's innocence, offering a truce to the gangs in and around Staines to help them break into the vaults and retrieve the tape. They succeed and reinstate the original Prime Minister. Staines is saved from destruction, with the Prime Minister declaring that Slough will be destroyed instead. The film ends with Ali as the British ambassador to Jamaica, where Carlton is forced to dance for Ali's amusement.

Cast

 Sacha Baron Cohen as Ali G and Borat Sagdiyev
 Michael Gambon as the Prime Minister
 Charles Dance as Deputy Prime Minister David Carlton
 Kellie Bright as Me Julie (credited as Kelly Bright) 
 Martin Freeman as Ricky C
 Rhona Mitra as Kate Hedges
 Barbara New as Ali's Nan
 Ray Panthaki as Hassan B
 Emilio Rivera as Rico
 Paul Clayton as Alan Swan Lake
 Olegar Fedoro as Russian Minister
 Tony Way as Dangerous Dave
 Eileen Essell as Mrs. Hugh
 Daniella Lavender as Maid
 Capri Ashby as Nurse Nina
 John Scott Martin as Mr. Johnson
 Graham McTavish as Customs Officer
 Naomi Campbell as herself
 Nabil Elouahabi as Jezzy F
 Bruce Jamieson as Journalist
 Anna Keaveney as Secretary

Production
The opening "gangland" dream sequence was filmed in Los Angeles, with all other scenes filmed in Manchester, London, and Staines. Filming also took place at Manchester Town Hall between 31 May and 2 June 2001. When Ali references the Berkshire Massiv of Englefield Green in the film, this is actually in Surrey; the John Nike Leisure Centre is a real facility, called Willesden Sports centre which was later knocked down in real life with them building  a new leisure centre in its place.

Release
The film premiered in the United Kingdom on 22 March 2002, and was released in various other countries throughout the rest of 2002 and midway through 2003. It was given a limited theatrical release in the United States. On September 5, 2003, the film was released on a few screens in Austin, Texas.

The film was released via DVD in the UK on 11 November 2002, and in the US and Canada on 2 November 2004. The DVD version has been modified from the original UK cinema version. In the original cut, the film opens with Ali appearing over the BBFC Certificate and changes the categorisation from 15 to 18. He goes on to warn about the dangers of having sex in the back row of the cinema (coming into contact with other people's semen on the seats) and to suggest that the audience's enjoyment will be enhanced by smoking cannabis. This 30-second introduction is missing from all international cinema releases and all current home video releases.

Reception

Commercial performance
The film grossed a total of £17.2 million on a budget of £5 million.

Critical reception
The film received mixed reviews. The review aggregator website Rotten Tomatoes reported that 53% of critics have given the film a positive review based on 17 reviews, with an average rating of 5.16/10. On Metacritic, the film has a weighted average score of 46 out of 100 based on 9 critic reviews, indicating "mixed or average reviews". It opened to some notably negative reviews from critics; however, over the years, the film began to receive some positive mentions following the successes of Baron Cohen's subsequent films Borat and Brüno. While some hailed it as a successful low culture comedy, it inspired little of the strong fan enthusiasm associated with Da Ali G Show and Borat.

Soundtrack

On 18 March 2002, a soundtrack album for the film was released. Featuring music used in the film, it also featured linking material by Ali G as if the album were a pirate radio broadcast on Ali's "Drive By FM". It was an enhanced CD, featuring the music video for "Me Julie".

Cultural impact
In 2012, Staines was officially renamed by the local council to Staines-upon-Thames partly to avoid the fictional gang associations implied by the film.

References

External links

 
 
 "The ultimate Borat + Ali G website"
 Ali G InDaHouse London Film Review 
 

2002 films
2000s satirical films
British satirical films
2000s French-language films
2000s Spanish-language films
Films based on television series
British films about cannabis
Films directed by Mark Mylod
Films set in London
Films set in Surrey
Films shot in Greater Manchester
Films shot in London
Films shot in Los Angeles
Films shot in Surrey
Hood comedy films
Films produced by Eric Fellner
Films produced by Tim Bevan
Films with screenplays by Sacha Baron Cohen
Films with screenplays by Dan Mazer
2002 soundtrack albums
Hip hop soundtracks
Island Records soundtracks
Rhythm and blues soundtracks
Staines-upon-Thames
StudioCanal films
Working Title Films films
2000s hip hop films
2002 directorial debut films
Comedy film soundtracks
2000s English-language films
2000s British films
Indahouse